Maheno may refer to:

 Maheno, New Zealand, a township in North Otago, New Zealand, south of Oamaru
 SS Maheno, a 20th-century ship
 Maheno is a Persian word which means new moon